|}

La Coupe de Maisons-Laffitte is a Group 3 flat horse race in France open to thoroughbreds aged three years or older. It is run at Maisons-Laffitte over a distance of 2,000 metres (about 1¼ miles), and it is scheduled to take place each year in September.

History
The event was established in 1906, and it was originally called La Coupe d'Or. One of its early trophies was a gold cup with two ivory figures sculpted by Henri Allouard. It was later decided that such valuable trophies would only be awarded to owners who won the race three times within twelve years, but this was never achieved.

La Coupe d'Or was abandoned throughout World War I. There was no running from 1914 to 1918.  One person owns the 1908 Gold Cup in its original condition.  I also have an original oil painting of Seasick, the horse that won the race.  Painting done by Emil Adam in 1908.  I will attempt to post pictures of these items shortly.

The race was cancelled twice during World War II, in 1939 and 1940. The trophy scheme was discarded in 1941, and from this point the event was titled La Coupe de Maisons-Laffitte. It was held at Longchamp in 1941 and 1942, and at Le Tremblay in 1944. It went back to Longchamp in 1945, and returned to Maisons-Laffitte in 1946.

The distance of the race has remained unchanged throughout its history.

Records
Most successful horse (2 wins):
 Jocker – 1948, 1949
 Fair Mix – 2002, 2004
 Musical Way – 2006, 2007

Leading jockey (5 wins):
 Roger Poincelet – Cordon Rouge (1943), Un Gaillard (1944), Oural (1946), Dalama (1961), Tout Fait (1965)
 Olivier Peslier – Gunboat Diplomacy (1995), Running Flame (1996), Agol Lack (2000), Prospect Park (2005), Dawn Intello (2021)

Leading trainer (5 wins):
 André Fabre – Nasr El Arab (1988), Tel Quel (1991), Dernier Empereur (1994), Fractional (2014), Agol Lack (2000)
 René Pelat – Cordon Rouge (1943), Oural (1946), Jocker (1948, 1949), Jolly Friar (1954)

Leading owner (4 wins):
 Marcel Boussac – Priam (1945), Pharsale (1952), Dalama (1961), Locris (1970)
 Sheikh Mohammed – Nasr El Arab (1988), Tel Quel (1991), Knifebox (1992), Lord of Men (1998)

Winners since 1980

Earlier winners

 1906: Maintenon
 1907: Ben
 1908: Sea Sick
 1909: Syphon
 1910: Le Rubicon
 1911: Cadet Roussel
 1912: Martial
 1913: Nimbus
 1914–18: no race
 1919: Bambino
 1920: Le Rapin
 1921: Harpocrate
 1922: Bahadur
 1923: Scopas
 1924: Scaramouche
 1925: Ptolemy
 1926: Apelle
 1927: Iberia
 1928: Javelot
 1929: Kantara
 1930: Parth for Ever
 1931: Sans Ame
 1932: Jus de Raisin 1
 1933: Magnus
 1934: Sa Parade
 1935: Rarity
 1936: Davout
 1937: Frexo
 1938: Khasnadar
 1939–40: no race
 1941: Triancourt
 1942: Fair Love
 1943: Cordon Rouge
 1944: Un Gaillard
 1945: Priam
 1946: Oural
 1947: L'Imperial
 1948: Jocker
 1949: Jocker
 1950: Violoncelle
 1951:
 1952: Pharsale
 1953: Cosmos
 1954: Jolly Friar
 1955: The Parson
 1956: Cobetto
 1957: Franc Luron
 1958: Fric
 1959:
 1960: Point d'Amour
 1961: Dalama
 1962: Djebel Traffic
 1963: Monade
 1964: Trac / Visavis 2
 1965: Tout Fait
 1966: Prominer / Red Vagabonde 2
 1967: A Tempo
 1968: Batitu
 1969: Karabas
 1970: Locris
 1971: Gold Rod
 1972: Tratteggio
 1973: Amadou
 1974: Wittgenstein
 1975: Trepan
 1976: Iron Duke
 1977: Dona Barod
 1978: Rusticaro
 1979: Look Fast

1 The 1932 race finished as a dead-heat between Fenolo and Jus de Raisin, but a winner was decided by a run-off.2 The 1964 and 1966 races were dead-heats and have joint winners.

See also
 List of French flat horse races
 Recurring sporting events established in 1906 – this race is included under its original title, La Coupe d'Or.

References
 France Galop / Racing Post:
 france-galop.com – A Brief History: La Coupe de Maisons-Laffitte.
 galopp-sieger.de – La Coupe de Maisons-Laffitte.
 horseracingintfed.com – International Federation of Horseracing Authorities – La Coupe de Maisons-Laffitte (2016).
 pedigreequery.com – La Coupe de Maisons-Laffitte – Maisons-Laffitte.

Open middle distance horse races
Maisons-Laffitte Racecourse
Horse races in France
1906 establishments in France
Recurring sporting events established in 1906